Gerard William Noonan (24 November 1951 – 26 June 2017) was an Australian rules footballer who played for the Fitzroy Football Club in the Victorian Football League (VFL).

References

External links

1951 births
2017 deaths
Fitzroy Football Club players
Koroit Football Club players
Australian rules footballers from Victoria (Australia)